The Lineup is an American police drama which aired on CBS radio from 1950 to 1953 and on CBS television from 1954 to 1960.

Syndicated reruns of the series were broadcast under the title  San Francisco Beat.

Radio
The radio version depicted the investigations of Lieutenant Ben Guthrie (played by Bill Johnstone, one of several actors to play The Shadow on radio) and Sergeant Matt Greb (played by Wally Maher until his death on December 27, 1951), later replaced by Sergeant Pete Carger (played by Jack Moyles), detectives in the police force of an unnamed "great American city". The primary writer of the radio series was Blake Edwards.

Television
The television version was set specifically in San Francisco and was produced with the cooperation of the San Francisco Police Department, which received a credit at the close of each episode.  It starred Warner Anderson as Guthrie and Tom Tully as Grebb. Grebb was now an inspector instead of a sergeant because at the time the series was made there was no such rank as sergeant in the Bureau of Inspectors, SFPD's investigative division, and a full inspector was the closest equivalent to the generic detective sergeant the character had been on radio.  The TV version, a CBS Television production, was filmed on location, using Desilu's production facilities.

In the final season, the show expanded to an hour, and the Grebb character was replaced by a number of younger officers, including Policewoman Sandy McAllister (played by Rachel Ames). Others in the cast were Jan Brooks, Bob Palmer, Skip Ward, William Leslie, Tod Burton, Marshall Reed, and Ruta Lee. The announcer was Art Gilmore.

The Lineup was a Top 20 Nielsen ratings hit for three of its six seasons during its original network run.
The series finished at number 17 in the Nielsen ratings for the 1955–1956 season, at number 16 for 1956–1957 and at number 18 for 1957–1958. It received an Emmy nomination for Best Action or Adventure Series in 1956.

Cast
Warner Anderson as Det. Lt. Ben Guthrie
Tom Tully as Inspector Matt Grebb (seasons 1–5)

Episodes

Season 1: 1954–55

Season 2: 1955–56

Season 3: 1956–57

Season 4: 1957–58

Season 5: 1958–59

Season 6: 1959–60

Guest stars

Russ Conway appeared in "The Robert Avery Case" (1957) and "The Missing Cargo Case" (1958).
Walter Coy appeared in "The Murdered Blonde Case" (May 8, 1959). 
Ron Hagerthy appeared in "The Toy Tiger Case" and then as John Oakhurst in "The Security Officer Case" (1957). 
Rodolfo Hoyos Jr. guest-starred as Luis Gonzalez in "The Reluctant Addict Case" (1957).
Douglas Kennedy appeared in "The Charles Cleveland Case" (1959) and "The Drugstore Cowgirl Case" (1959). 
Joyce Meadows appeared as Paula Adams in "The Boylston Billing Case" (1959).
Eve Miller appeared in "The Christmas Story" (1954), "The Stanley Devlin Case" (1957) and "The Daniel Leadley Case" (1959).
Nan Leslie was cast three times, in  "The Chick Madison Case" (1958) and "The Pigeon Drop Case" and "The Girls and Guns Case" (both 1959).
Donna Martell guest-starred in "Girl Safecrackers" (1955) and "The Pawn Ticket Case" (1958).

Film version
The film The Lineup, based on the series, was released in 1958 by Columbia Pictures, with Eli Wallach in the starring role. It was directed by Don Siegel, who had also directed "The Paisley Gang", the pilot episode of the television series.

References

External links

1950 radio programme debuts
1953 radio programme endings
1950s American radio programs
American radio dramas
CBS Radio programs
Detective radio shows
Radio programs adapted into television shows
1954 American television series debuts
1960 American television series endings
1950s American crime drama television series
1960s American crime drama television series
1950s American police procedural television series
1960s American police procedural television series
Black-and-white American television shows
CBS original programming
English-language television shows
Fictional portrayals of the San Francisco Police Department
Television series based on radio series
Television series by CBS Studios
Television shows set in San Francisco